Kona Town is the debut album by reggae band Pepper. The album title is a reference to the town of Kailua-Kona on the Big Island of Hawaii.

Track listing 
 "The Good Thing" - 0:26
 "Stone Love" - 4:14
 "Dry Spell" - 3:55
 "Face Plant" - 3:19
 "Tradewinds" - 4:16
 "Stormtrooper" - 5:27
 "Ho's" - 3:27
 "B.O.O.T." - 4:08
 "Give It Up" - 3:21
 "Sitting on the Curb" - 3:02
 "Too Much" - 3:24
 "Tongues" - 3:35
 "Office" - 3:52

References

External links 
Pepper

2002 albums
Pepper (band) albums
Volcom Entertainment albums